Regeneration is the 20th album by Roy Orbison. According to the authorised Roy Orbison biography, the album was released in November 1976. It marked the return to Monument Records where he had launched his greatest successes over fifteen years earlier where he released some of his greatest hits. However, it would be a one-time only rekindling of the business relationship as Orbison, not happy with the material he was given to record, asked Fred Foster to annul his contract – which he did.

Track listing

Side one
"I'm a Southern Man" (Tony Joe White)
"No Chain at All" (Bob Morrison)
"Old Love Song" (Bob Morrison, Alice Kiester)
"Can't Wait" (Alan Rush, Dennis Linde)
"Born to Love Me" (Bob Morrison)

Side two
"Blues in My Mind" (Fred Rose)
"Something They Can't Take Away" (Kris Kristofferson)
"Under Suspicion" (Alan Rush, Dennis Linde)
"I Don't Really Want You" (Dennis Linde)
"Belinda" (Dennis Linde)

Personnel
Roy Orbison – vocals
Grady Martin, John Christopher, Reggie Young, Steve Gibson – guitar
Tommy Cogbill – bass guitar
Bobby Emmons, Bobby Wood, Shane Keister – keyboards
Gene Chrisman, Jerry Carrigan – drums
Farrell Morris – percussion
Charles Rose, Harrison Calloway, Harvey Thompson, Billy Puett, Dennis Good, George Tidwell – horns
Bergen White, Buzz Cason, Dennis Linde, Diane Tidwell, Ginger Holladay, Janie Fricke, Laverna Moore, Lisa Silver, Sheri Kramer, The Cherry Sisters, Tom Brannon – backing vocals
Brenton Banks, Byron Bach, Carl Gorodetzky, Christian Teal, Gary Vanosdale, George Binkley, Lennie Haight, Martha McCrory, Martin Katahn, Marvin Chantry, Pam Sixfin, Roy Christensen, Sheldon Kurland, Stephanie Woolf, Steven Smith, Virginia Christensen – strings
Tracks 3, 5, 6, 8 Arranged by Bill Justis
Tracks 4, 6, 10 Arranged by Bergen White

References

Roy Orbison albums
1977 albums
Albums arranged by Bill Justis
Albums produced by Fred Foster
Monument Records albums